The Utah Utes baseball team is the varsity intercollegiate baseball program of University of Utah in Salt Lake City Utah, United States. The program's first season was in 1892, and it has been a member of the NCAA Division I Pac-12 Conference since the start of the 2012 season. Its home venue is Smith's Ballpark, located in downtown Salt Lake City. Gary Henderson is the team's head coach starting in the 2022 season. The program has appeared in 5 NCAA Tournaments. It has won 1 conference tournament championship and 4 regular season conference titles. As of the start of the 2021 Major League Baseball season, 17 former Utes have appeared in Major League Baseball.

Year by year record

Conference membership
 1939–1962: Mountain States Conference
 1963–1999: Western Athletic Conference
 2000–2011: Mountain West Conference
 2012–present: Pac-12 Conference

Utah in the NCAA Tournament

Individual awards

All Americans

 1951
James Cleverly, 2B

 1959
Archie Skeen, C

 1981
Phil Strom, DH

 1997
Casey Child, OF

 2001
Chris Shelton, SS

 2006
Ryan Khoury, SS

 2010
C. J. Cron, DH

 2011
C. J. Cron, 1B

Conference awards

 Mountain West Player of the Year
Chris Shelton – 2001
Mitch Maio – 2002
Ryan Khoury – 2006
C. J. Cron – 2010, 2011

 Mountain West Freshman of the Year
Mike Westfall, 2001
C. J. Cron, 2009

Current and former major league players

 Billy Cowan
 Stephen Fife
 Randy Gomez
 John Noriega
 Bill Parsons
 Chris Shelton
 Steve Springer
 George Theodore
 C. J. Cron

Source: Baseball Reference

See also
 List of NCAA Division I baseball programs

References

External links
 Official website